Tyrone Amey (born 20 January 1996) is an Australian professional rugby league footballer. He previously played for the Newcastle Knights in the National Rugby League.

Background
Born in Gosford, New South Wales, Amey played his junior rugby league for the South Lakes Roosters, before being signed by the Newcastle Knights.

Playing career

Early career
In 2015 and 2016, Amey played for the Newcastle Knights' NYC team.

2017
In 2017, Amey graduated to the Knights' Intrust Super Premiership NSW team. In round 26 of the 2017 NRL season, he made his NRL debut for the Knights against the Cronulla-Sutherland Sharks. After the season ended, he re-signed with the Knights on a 1-year contract until the end of 2018.

2019
Ahead of the 2019 season, Amey joined the Maitland Pickers in the Newcastle Rugby League, after not being offered a new deal with the Knights.

References

External links
Newcastle Knights profile

1996 births
Living people
Australian rugby league players
Newcastle Knights players
Macquarie Scorpions players
Maitland Pickers players
Rugby league props
Rugby league locks
Rugby league players from Gosford, New South Wales